Lusitano is a Portuguese horse breed.

Lusitano may also refer to:

People
 Vicente Lusitano, Portuguese composer
 Vieira Lusitano, Portuguese painter
 Amato Lusitano, Portuguese physician

Sports
 US Créteil-Lusitanos, French football club
 US Lusitanos Saint-Maur, French football club
 Lusitano F.C. (Portugal), Portuguese football club
 Lusitano F.C. (South Africa), a team from Johannesburg
 Lusitano FCV, Portuguese football club
 Luzitano Futebol Clube, Brazilian football club
 Lusitano G.C., Portuguese football club
 Gremio Lusitano, American soccer team
 Ludlow Lusitano, American soccer team
 Lusitanos XV, Portuguese rugby union club

See also
 Lusitania (disambiguation)
 Lusitanops, a genus of sea snails
 Lusitanosaurus, dinosaur
 Integralismo Lusitano, Portuguese political movement